The 1922 Iowa State Senate elections took place as part of the biennial 1922 United States elections. Iowa voters elected state senators in 21 of the state senate's 50 districts. State senators serve four-year terms in the Iowa State Senate.

A statewide map of the 50 state Senate districts in the 1922 elections is provided by the Iowa General Assembly here.

The primary election on June 5, 1922 determined which candidates appeared on the November 7, 1922 general election ballot.

Following the previous election, Republicans had control of the Iowa Senate with 48 seats to Democrats' 2 seats.

Republicans maintained control of the Iowa State Senate following the 1922 general election with the balance of power shifting to Republicans holding 47 seats and Democrats having 3 seats (a net gain of 1 seat for Democrats). The death of Republican Senator D. C. Chase of district 37 necessitated a special election on March 31, 1923. Democrat William Schmedika went on to win that special election, flipping the seat to Democrats and increasing Democrats' seats to 4 in 1923.

Summary of Results
Note: The 29 holdover Senators not up for re-election are not listed on this table.

Source:

Detailed Results
NOTE: The 29 districts that did not hold elections in 1922 are not listed here.

Note: If a district does not list a primary, then that district did not have a competitive primary (i.e., there may have only been one candidate file for that district).

District 1

District 7

District 9

District 10

District 12

District 13

District 18

District 20

District 21

District 22

District 29

District 30

District 34

District 35

District 37

Senator Chase died in office, which necessitated a special election to fill the 37th district seat.

District 38

District 42

District 44

District 45

District 48

District 50

See also
 United States elections, 1922
 United States House of Representatives elections in Iowa, 1922
 Elections in Iowa

References

1922 Iowa elections
Iowa Senate
Iowa Senate elections